In statistics, Lukacs's proportion-sum independence theorem is a result that is used when studying proportions, in particular the Dirichlet distribution. It is named after Eugene Lukacs.

The theorem 
If Y1 and Y2 are non-degenerate, independent random variables, then the random variables

 

are independently distributed if and only if both Y1 and Y2 have gamma distributions with the same scale parameter.

Corollary
Suppose Y i, i = 1, ..., k be non-degenerate, independent, positive random variables.  Then each of k − 1 random variables

is independent of

 

if and only if all the Y i have gamma distributions with the same scale parameter.

References

  page 64.  Lukacs's proportion-sum independence theorem and the corollary with a proof.

Probability theorems
Characterization of probability distributions